Tra quante regione ("Amongst all the regions") is a ballata by the late medieval and early renaissance composer Hugo de Lantins. As with another vocal composition by Guillaume Dufay entitled Vasilissa ergo gaude, Lantins' ballata celebrated the marriage of the Italian princess Cleofa Malatesta with the Byzantine Despot of the Morea Theodore II Palaiologos. The marriage took place on 21 January 1421 or sometime in 1422 in Mystra. The actual date and place of the first performance remain disputed

References

Renaissance music